{{DISPLAYTITLE:C45H38O18}}
The molecular formula C45H38O18 (molar mass: 866.77 g/mol, exact mass: 866.205814 u) may refer to:

 Arecatannin B1, a condensed tannin found in the betel nut
 Procyanidin C1, a condensed tannin found in grape
 Procyanidin C2, a condensed tannin found in grape and barley

Molecular formulas